Leaf scorch (also called leaf burn, leaf wilt, and sun scorch) is a browning of plant tissues, including leaf margins and tips, and yellowing or darkening of veins which may lead to eventual wilting and abscission of the leaf.

Causes 
Leaf scorch can be caused by soil compaction, transplant shock, nutrient deficiency, nutrient excess, drought, salt toxicity, herbicide injury, and disease injury.

Treatment 
Affected plants may sometimes recover through watering and fertilization (if the cause is not over-fertilization). Light pruning may also help to reduce the water-pumping load on the roots and xylem.

In the case of leaf scorch through over-fertilization, recovery may take time, requiring a treatment of a slow leaching process through drip irrigation over 24–48 hours.

Prevention 
Reversal of symptoms and damage can be enacted through the following cultural practices:
 Pruning sprouts and affected areas
 Avoiding frequent, light waterings which promote unhealthy root systems
 Watering heavily to promote deep root systems
 Avoiding over-fertilization

See also 
 Fertilizer
 Forest pathology
 Nitrogen burn

References 

Physiological plant disorders